Upside Down is a South Korean documentary film about the sinking of the MV Sewol, directed by Kim Dong-bin.

The film received funds from a successful Kickstarter campaign.

References

External links
 
 
 

2015 films
2010s Korean-language films
South Korean documentary films
Documentary films about maritime disasters
Documentary films about MV Sewol
Kickstarter-funded documentaries
2015 documentary films
Kickstarter-funded films
2010s South Korean films